{{Infobox television station
| callsign               = WYCN-LD
| logo                   = 
| location               = Providence, Rhode Island
| city                   =
| country                = United States
| branding               = Telemundo ProvidenceNoticiero Telemundo Nueva Inglaterra (newscasts)
| digital                = 36 (UHF)
| virtual                = 8
| subchannels            = 
| translators            = WRIW-CD 51 (17 UHF) Providence
| affiliations           = 8.1: Telemundo (1995–2016, 2019–present)8.2: TeleXitos8.3: Cozi TV8.4: LX
| owner                  = (Comcast/NBCUniversal)
| licensee               = Station Venture Operations, LP
| airdate                = (in Boston, Massachusetts; license moved to Providence in 2019)
| callsign_meaning       = "We're Your Community Network"(former branding for the current WBTS-CD under Nashua community broadcasting format)| sister_stations        = WNEU, WBTS-CD, WVIT, WRDM-CD, NECN, NBC Sports Boston
| former_callsigns       = 
| former_channel_numbers = 
| former_affiliations    = 
| erp                    = 12.124 kW
| haat                   = 
| facility_id            = 64996
| coordinates            = 
| licensing_authority    = FCC
| website                =  
}}

WYCN-LD (channel 8) is a low-power television station in Providence, Rhode Island, United States, broadcasting the Spanish-language Telemundo network. Owned and operated by NBCUniversal's Telemundo Station Group, the station has studios on Kenney Drive in Cranston, Rhode Island (shared with NBC affiliate WJAR (channel 10), owned by the Sinclair Broadcast Group), and its transmitter is located on East Main Street in Norton, Massachusetts.

Originally licensed to Boston, the station was founded in 1995 as W32AY by the Spanish-language television network Telemundo (which was then under separate ownership). Later, as WTMU-LP, it carried that network as a translator of Merrimack, New Hampshire-licensed WNEU (channel 60), whose signal did not reach the entire city of Boston.

On January 7, 2016, NBC Owned Television Stations President Valari Staab confirmed that NBC had declined to renew its affiliation with Boston-based WHDH (channel 7), and that it planned to launch an owned-and-operated outlet to be known as NBC Boston on January 1, 2017. At the time, NBC did not announce which station(s) would be used to carry the new service over-the-air, and WHDH's owner Sunbeam Television sued NBCUniversal under the presumption that it planned to only use WNEU, contending that doing so would have considerably reduced the ability of viewers to receive the network over the air in Boston, thus bolstering the cable services provided by NBCUniversal's parent company Comcast in the area.

On August 31, 2016, NBCUniversal filed to acquire the low-power station from its owner ZGS Communications. The following month, ZGS filed a request to the Federal Communications Commission (FCC) to upgrade the station to a digital signal. NBC later announced that the station, renamed WBTS-LD, would serve as the main station of the NBC Boston service as part of a simulcast with WNEU-DT2 (virtual channel 60.2). Until April 1, 2018, NBC also leased a subchannel of WMFP (virtual channel 60.5) in Lawrence, Massachusetts to provide an alternate full-power signal for viewers in the Boston area. On January 18, 2018, it started an additional transmission service in the Boston area through a channel sharing agreement with PBS member station WGBX-TV (channel 44), under the license of WYCN-CD (now WBTS-CD).

Due to its low-power status, WYCN-LD's broadcast radius does not cover the entire Providence–New Bedford market. It is therefore simulcast in widescreen standard definition on Class A translator station WRIW-CD (channel 51), which shares spectrum with Providence-licensed full-power PBS member station WSBE-TV (channel 36).

History

Early years
The station first signed on the air in April 1995 as W32AY, operating on UHF channel 32 from the Prudential Tower in Boston as a Telemundo owned-and-operated station. In September 2000, the station began to simulcast its programming on WWDP (channel 46), giving it a chance to better compete with Univision affiliate WUNI (channel 27), the established Spanish-language station in the area. Telemundo sold W32AY to ZGS Communications in 2001. In February 2002, W32AY changed its call letters to WTMU-LP, and on July 1, WWDP discontinued its relay of the station's programming.

In December 2002, NBC (which had acquired Telemundo in 2001) purchased WPXB (channel 60, now WNEU); WNEU began to carry Telemundo programming as a satellite of WTMU in April 2003.

WTMU went off-the-air in 2004, as the channel 32 allocation had been assigned to WBPX for its digital signal, and the station's attempt to move to channel 67 was hindered by interference from WBPX's analog signal on channel 68. WTMU resumed broadcasting operations in December 2006; it reduced its effective radiated power and relocated its transmitter to a tower in Medford to alleviate the interference.

Although low-power stations were exempt from the 2009 analog shutdown that full-service stations were subject to, WTMU initiated plans for a digital signal on October 27, 2006 by applying for a construction permit for a digital companion channel on VHF channel 3. On August 28, 2008, WTMU changed its plans and applied to flash-cut to channel 42, which was to have become available after WHDH moved its digital signal to VHF channel 7; the original application was dismissed by the FCC on March 27, 2009, but a new application was filed on May 21. A move was necessary, as the spectrum that channel 67 is located within had been auctioned off and was being removed from the television bandplan as a result of the transition.

Before WTMU's application could be approved, WHDH requested to return its digital signal to channel 42, leading WTMU to withdraw its application for the channel on August 24 and filing instead to move to channel 46; the FCC dismissed the channel 42 application on August 26, 2009, at the same time also canceling the construction permit for the previously-proposed digital companion channel. In the meantime, WTMU was unable to get a digital signal on the air before being forced to terminate the analog signal on April 9, 2010, resulting in the station suspending operations. To avoid losing its license due to not broadcasting for a year, WTMU resumed broadcasting on April 4, 2011, using its existing analog facilities but operating on channel 46 under special temporary authority (STA). It again suspended operations on April 9, but returned to the air on March 14, 2012.

Sale and switch to NBC

On August 31, 2015, Broadcasting & Cable reported that NBCUniversal was considering the possibility of purchasing former NBC affiliate WHDH, whose affiliation was set to expire at the end of 2016. On October 1, 2015, The Boston Globe reported that NBC had considered moving the affiliation to its cable channel NECN rather than to an over-the-air channel, although the company declined to comment. On December 15, 2015, New England One reported, citing internal sources, that NBCUniversal had declined to renew its affiliation with WHDH, and was in the process of preparing WTMU-LP's parent station, WNEU, to become an NBC O&O by hiring staff for an English-language news operation, including former WHDH meteorologist Pete Bouchard. The Boston Herald reported two days later that the station would prospectively be branded as "NBC Boston", and that WNEU's existing Telemundo programming could be moved to a different subchannel. Following the reports, Paul Magnes, WHDH's vice president and general manager, told the Herald that the station still expected its NBC affiliation to be renewed, while NBCUniversal again declined to comment.

Sunbeam argued that WNEU's signal served 4 million fewer viewers than WHDH because it is located in Merrimack, New Hampshire, which is northwest of Boston, rather than in Boston proper. WNEU's signal only has overlap with the northwest portion of WHDH's signal. Sunbeam's owner, Ed Ansin, told the Globe that "No network has elected to give up such a strong station and go to a startup station," after having disclosed that he had rejected a $200 million offer to sell WHDH to NBC in September 2015, leading the network to threaten to shift its programming to WNEU; however, he still predicted that NBC would remain on channel 7.

On January 7, 2016, Valari Staab, president of NBC Owned Television Stations, confirmed that NBC had declined to renew its affiliation with WHDH beyond the end of 2016, and would launch NBC Boston on January 1, 2017, Staab explained that with NBC's recent investments into the studio facilities of NECN and WNEU, "we have built a very strong news organization in the Boston market both from a personnel and facilities perspective—which puts us in a great position to launch an NBC-owned station locally." The station is led by NECN and Telemundo Boston's general manager Mike St. Peter. Staab did not outright confirm whether WNEU would carry NBC programming, but iterated that the network would remain available over-the-air following the transition, and that NBCUniversal was "committed to expanding our over-the-air coverage of the market and are currently looking at a variety of options to accomplish that".

On March 10, 2016, Sunbeam Television sued Comcast in the District Court for the District of Massachusetts, arguing that moving NBC to WNEU would violate antitrust law by strengthening its near-monopoly position in the market, and FCC conditions on Comcast's acquisition of NBC, as the company had agreed not to reduce over-the-air coverage of NBC, nor use its cable holdings to influence affiliation negotiations. On May 16, 2016, the lawsuit was thrown out, with the judge arguing that the possible loss of OTA coverage was "not a concern that WHDH has standing to redress", and that "absent any actionable harm attributable to Comcast, it is simply an indurate consequence of doing business in a competitive and unsentimental marketplace."

On May 18, 2016, the Boston Herald reported that NBCUniversal was considering acquiring Ion Television station WBPX-TV (channel 68). The Ion Media-owned station covers a similar coverage area to WHDH, lessening the impact of a potential switch. On June 13, 2016, the Herald also suggested that NBC could purchase or trade for Fox affiliate WFXT (channel 25) to use as its O&O instead (which would cause WHDH to theoretically switch from NBC to Fox, the same affiliation as its Miami sister station), believing that Cox Media Group (which had received the station in a trade with Fox Television Stations for its San Francisco station KTVU) would be interested in divesting the station due to declines it has faced since the sale. WFXT's general manager, WHDH's general manager, and NBC denied that any of these ideas were being considered.

On August 31, 2016, ZGS Communications agreed to sell WTMU-LP to NBCUniversal's Station Venture Operations subsidiary for $100,000. Concurrently, ZGS entered into a local programming and marketing agreement with another NBCUniversal subsidiary, WBTS Television, LLC, to operate WTMU-LP. The sale was approved by the FCC on October 28, 2016  and completed on November 4, 2016. On September 14, 2016, ZGS filed for a license to cover WTMU's digital construction permit: that is, to upgrade the station to a digital signal; the license was granted on September 21, 2016. On September 19, 2016 (four days after the sale of WTMU was filed with the FCC), NBCUniversal announced that it was in the process of acquiring a Boston station to supplement WNEU's coverage, which it said would "factor into our plan" to create the NBC owned-and-operated station that would replace WHDH; the company did not confirm that the station was WTMU. The station's call letters were changed to WBTS-LD on October 6, 2016, and on October 25, 2016, the station received FCC approval to switch its PSIP virtual channel number from 46 to channel 8, allowing it over-the-air parity within Boston proper with other low-numbered stations.

NBCUniversal would later purchase the entirety of ZGS for $75 million in April 2018, reuniting WBTS-LD with its fourteen sister stations (all of them Telemundo affiliates converted to network O&Os) after a year-long interregnum.

Launch

On November 1, 2016, NBCUniversal officially announced that it would broadcast its new NBC Boston service across WBTS-LD and WNEU-DT2, and unveiled details surrounding the station's launch programming and news department. Mike St. Peter pointed out that although the two stations combined would not have the same over-the-air coverage as WHDH, 97% of viewers in the Boston market were pay television subscribers, and NBC would "continue to look for how we can improve over-the-air service".

On November 10, 2016, WBTS-LD and WNEU-DT2 began to carry a transitional programming service branded as Countdown NBC Boston''. The service was designed to promote the switch and assist viewers in locating NBC Boston's over-the-air channels, it featured NBC Boston's future syndicated programming, programs from Cozi TV, and newscasts simulcast from NECN. The NBC Boston website and social media outlets were also launched at this time. On December 12, 2016, NBC announced that it would lease a digital subchannel on WMFP in Lawrence to further expand WBTS-LD's coverage in Greater Boston. The WMFP subchannel used WNEU's virtual channel 60, mapping to 60.5 in order to avert confusion with any of WMFP's other subchannels and help over-the-air viewers determine if WNEU-DT2 or WMFP-DT5 provided a better signal source for their home. The WMFP-DT5 simulcast was scaled to 720p (rather than being presented in NBC's native 1080i) resolution, likely due to WMFP having both bandwidth limitations and its transmission facilities not being upgraded yet to allow a multiplexed signal with two HD subchannels.

The change in affiliation officially took effect at 3:00 a.m. ET on January 1, 2017, making WBTS the third station in Boston to carry NBC after WBZ-TV (channel 4) and WHDH. As a final pre-launch promotion for the switch, WBTS broadcast coverage of Boston's First Night New Year's Eve festivities hosted by the station's lead news anchors Phil Lipof and Shannon Mulaire, which was also simulcast across NECN, WNEU, and CSN New England. Meanwhile, WHDH carried its final night of NBC prime time programming on December 31, 2016, including the network's national New Year's coverage.

Later developments
During 2017, the station referred to itself in most promotions as "NBC Boston Channel 10", citing its cable channel number in most of the market rather than its virtual channel 8 for WBTS-LD or virtual channel 60 for the simulcasts on WNEU or WMFP. On December 31, 2017, in conjunction with its First Night coverage, WBTS-LD introduced a new logo and brand designation as NBC 10 Boston, to indicate its channel number on most area cable TV providers, although the nearby Providence, Rhode Island NBC affiliate WJAR, which has broadcast as channel 10 since 1953, also uses the brand designation "NBC 10".

WMFP sold its frequency rights as part of the FCC's 2017 spectrum auction; in the auction, the station indicated that it would continue operations through a channel sharing agreement.

On October 18, 2017, NBC agreed to purchase WYCN-CD, a Nashua, New Hampshire-based Class A station that had also sold its frequency rights as part of the spectrum auction. Previous owner OTA Broadcasting then entered into a channel sharing agreement with the WGBH Educational Foundation to carry WYCN-CD's signal over WGBX-TV to serve as the full market simulcast for WBTS-LD once NBC acquired WYCN's license. The sale of WYCN-CD to NBC was completed on January 18, 2018; the station began channel sharing with WGBX the same day. The WMFP simulcast ended at midnight on April 1, 2018; WMFP began channel sharing with WWDP on September 7.

On August 8, 2019, WBTS and WYCN swapped call signs, with channel 8 becoming WYCN-LD and channel 15 changing to WBTS-CD. On August 31, 2019, WYCN-LD shut down its RF channel 46 transmitter; that October, it moved to channel 36, relocated its transmitter to Norton, Massachusetts, switched from NBC to Telemundo, and changed its city of license to Providence, leaving WBTS-CD as Boston's sole NBC station.

Technical information

Subchannels
The station's digital signal is multiplexed:

Repeaters

While WYCN-LD was technically considered the main station and official NBC affiliate for the Boston–Manchester market, the signal of the low-powered WYCN-LD was simulcast on WBTS-CD (which for all intents and purposes is a full-power station transmitting via WGBX's spectrum, as stated above) to ensure adequate reception across eastern Massachusetts, southern and central New Hampshire and some adjacent areas.

Until August 2019, WYCN-LD (as WBTS-LD) was relayed on WNEU's second digital subchannel to cover the northern portion of the market. The FCC considers WNEU as the parent license of WYCN-LD.

References

External links

1995 establishments in Massachusetts
Cozi TV affiliates
Low-power television stations in the United States
Television channels and stations established in 1995
YCN-LD
YCN-LD
Telemundo network affiliates
TeleXitos affiliates
LX (TV network) affiliates
Telemundo Station Group